The Champion Shots Medal is a military award of Australia. In Australia the three armed forces, the Royal Australian Navy, the Australian Army and the Royal Australian Air Force, conduct annual target-shooting competitions with standard issue weapons. Three medals – one for each force – are awarded to the winners.

No more than three medals can be awarded in each calendar year. If the same person receives a further Champion Shots award it is in the form of a date bar, which is attached to the ribbon of the original award. The most clasps awarded (as of 30 June 2006) is five, to Brett G. Hartman.

Multiple awards
The Champion Shots Medal is awarded with a clasp in the form of a date bar inscribed with the year the competition was won which is attached to the ribbon of the Medal. Subsequent awards are recognised by a further date bar attached to the ribbon above the original date bar.

When the ribbon is worn alone, the award of an additional clasp is indicated by an emblem in the form of a disc of antiqued brass bearing a device of laurel wreaths.

Eight people have been awarded additional clasps for their medals:
 Brett G. Hartman (five awards) – initial medal awarded in 1988 with clasps for 1989, 1990, 1994 and 2000
 Andrew Munn (five awards)
 Peter Richards (four awards)
 Stuart Boyd-Law (three awards)
 Peter Kelly (three awards)
 Luke Moran (three awards)
 Philip Macpherson (three awards)
 Jerome Dillon-Baker (two awards)

Description
 The medal is a circular antiqued brass medal 38 mm in diameter. It is ensigned with the Crown of St Edward, also in antiqued brass. Two wreaths of laurel leaves surround a symbol of two crossed rifles superimposed on the stars of the Southern Cross. 
 There is no design on the back of the medal.
 The medal is suspended from a 32 mm wide ribbon. The ribbon has a central dark blue vertical band flanked by two vertical bands of red, which are in turn bordered by two vertical bands of light blue.
 A clasp inscribed with the year awarded is attached to the ribbon.

See also
Australian Honours Order of Precedence

References

External links
Champion Shots Medal It's an Honour, Australian Government.

Military awards and decorations of Australia
1988 establishments in Australia
Awards established in 1988